Bharata is a character in the ancient Indian epic Ramayana. He is the son of Dashratha, the king of Kosala, and Kaikeyi, the daughter of King Ashvapati of Kekeya. He is a younger half-brother of Rama. He rules Ayodhya as its regent while Rama is banished from his kingdom, and fights to rescue his wife Sita, kidnapped by Ravana. 

He is married to Mandavi, daughter of Kushadhvaja, with whom he has two sons – Taksha and Pushkala.

In the Ramayana, Bharata is presented as a symbol of dharma. He is regarded to be an incarnation of the Sudarshana Chakra, the divine discus of Vishnu, while Rama is regarded to the incarnation of Vishnu himself.  

Today, Bharata is mostly worshipped in Kerala. One of the few temples in India dedicated to him is the Koodalmanikyam Temple.

Etymology 
Bharata in Sanskrit means "one to be [or being] maintained".

Legend

Early life 
Bharata was born in Ayodhya as the second son of King Dasharata, and the only child of his second wife, Kaikeyi. He spent his childhood with his elder half-brother and heir apparent to the Kosala kingdom, Rama, and his younger half-brothers, Lakshmana and Shatrughna. While Lakshmana was a loyalist of Rama, his twin, Shatrughna, was a loyalist of Bharata.

During Rama's betrothal to Sita, King Janaka of Videha and his younger brother King Kushadhvaja of Samkashya acquiesed to Dasharatha's request for the unity between the royal houses of Ikshvaku and Nimi. Bharata was hence was married to Kushadhvaja's daughter, Mandavi.

Regency 
Prior to Dasharatha's attempt to abdicate and hand over the throne to Rama, Bharata had left for the kingdom of Kekaya along with Shatrughna; his grandfather, King Ashvapati, had requested his presence, as he had been ill. During his absence, his mother Kaikeyi, under the influence of her maid Manthara, invoked two of the boons granted to her by Dasharatha, forcing him to overturn his decision for Rama to ascend the throne. Under duress, Dashratha named Bharata as his heir, and banished Rama from his kingdom for a period of fourteen years. Rama complied to his father's bidding, departing Ayodhya to live in Chitrakuta, accompanied by his wife Sita and half-brother Lakshmana. Soon after the departure of Rama, Dasharatha died of grief. Upon returning to Ayodhya, Bharata and Shatrughana were mortified to learn the events that had transpired in their absence. Bharata grew estranged from his mother and attempted to recall Rama, Sita, and Lakshmana from their exile.

After meeting the tribal king Guha of the Nishadas, and crossing the river Ganga, Bharata, along with Shatrughna and the army of Kosala, reached Chitrakuta. Lakshmana grew threatened by the presence of Bharata, and suggested that Rama prepare to defend himself. Watching Bharata approach alone in his ascetic garments, Rama allayed his fears. Bharata prostrated himself before Rama, and informed the trio of Dasharatha's passing. After expressing his desire to see Rama assume the throne, the half-brothers offered libations for their father's soul. The following morning, Bharata once again entreated Rama to assume the kingship, and undo the harm that had been caused by Kaikeyi's actions. If Rama refused, Bharata told him, he would live with him in the forest. Rama, however, told his half-brother that he was presently living in exile to fulfil his father's pledge, and that that latter must do the same. When Bharata realised that Rama could not be persuaded otherwise, he urged his half-brother to give him his sandals. He proposed to place Rama's sandals upon the throne of Ayodhya, and rule as a regent for the period of Rama's exile, as an ascetic. Rama consented to this idea. Bharata carried Rama's sandals upon his head, proceeding to Nandigrama, a village on the outskirts of Ayodhya. He had the throne of Ayodhya brought to the village, along with other royal paraphernalia. Placing the sandals on the throne to represent Rama, Bharata assumed the regency of Kosala for fourteen years, the kingdom administered from the village.

Later life 
Bharata met Hanuman in Nandigrama, who informed him about all the events that had transpired during Rama's exile. When Rama returned, Bharata approached him, with Rama's shoes above his head, and returned them to him. After Rama's coronation as the king of Kosala, Bharata reconciled with Kaikeyi.

After Sita's exile, Mandavi bore him two sons: Taksha and Pushkala. Bharata vanquished the gandharvas on the banks of the river Sindhu, and established Taksha as the ruler of Takshashila, and Pushkala as the ruler of Pushkalavati. Bharata assisted Rama in the performance of his ashvamedha sacrifice.

Bharata performed samadhi by drowning in the river Sarayu alongside Rama and Shatrughna, restored as an attribute of Vishnu.

Gallery

See also
 Lakshmana
 Shatrughna
 Dasharatha

References

Further reading 
 , translated in English by Griffith, from Project Gutenberg
 
 

Characters in the Ramayana
Solar dynasty